WTVG (channel 13) is a television station in Toledo, Ohio, United States, affiliated with ABC and The CW. Owned by Gray Television, the station maintains studios on Dorr Street (SR 246) in Toledo, and its transmitter is located on Stadium Road in Oregon, Ohio.

History

Early years
The station signed on the air on July 21, 1948, as WSPD-TV, owned by Storer Broadcasting along with WSPD radio (1370 AM and FM 101.5, now WRVF). The studios were originally located at 136 Huron Street in downtown Toledo. It was Toledo's first television station, and the first television station in the Storer Broadcasting chain.

Originally, the station carried programming from all four television networks: ABC, NBC, CBS and DuMont. However, it was a primary NBC affiliate, owing to its radio sisters' long affiliation with NBC radio. DuMont shut down in 1955, leaving WSPD-TV affiliated with just the big three networks.

In 1958, however, CBS moved its affiliation to newly signed-on WTOL-TV (channel 11), owing to its long affiliation with WTOL radio. WSPD kept its ABC and NBC affiliations. In 1961, WSPD radio moved to new studios in downtown Toledo, where they remain, WSPD-TV's studio building was remodeled within a year. WSPD-TV became an exclusive NBC affiliate in 1969, when Overmyer Broadcasting, then owner of then-independent WDHO-TV (channel 24, now WNWO-TV), persuaded ABC to move its affiliation there. By then, WSPD-TV had become the first station in northwest Ohio to broadcast in color.

Storer also owned WJBK-AM-FM-TV in Detroit and WJW-AM-FM-TV in Cleveland. Both WJBK-TV and WJW-TV were longstanding CBS affiliates. WSPD-TV provided city-grade coverage to most of Detroit's suburbs, while its grade B signal could be seen in Detroit and Cleveland. The Federal Communications Commission (FCC) grandfathered this situation under its "one-to-a-market" rule in the 1970s. Storer sold off WSPD-FM, WJW-FM, and WJBK-AM-FM (WDEE-AM/WDRQ-FM) in the early 1970s, WJW-AM in 1977, and WSPD-AM in 1979, but kept channel 13, and as a result of an FCC  rule in place then that stated that TV and radio stations in the same market, but with differing owners having to have different callsigns, became WTVG on October 1 of that year. By then the studio building on Huron Street had been outgrown and WTVG moved into its current studio building in southwest Toledo on Dorr Street. As with most Storer stations, the studio's facade has a Georgian mansion design, complete with columns.

The Storer stations were taken over by Kohlberg Kravis Roberts & Co. (KKR) in 1985. As a result, WTVG lost its grandfathered protection and was not sold to Gillett Communications along with the other Storer stations in 1987. Instead, it was sold to a local employee/investor group called Toledo Television, Inc. Toledo Television, in turn was bought out by SJL Broadcast Management in 1991.

As an ABC-owned station
In 1994, New World Communications, the owner of most of WTVG's former sister stations, signed an affiliation deal with the Fox Broadcasting Company, resulting in most of New World's stations switching affiliation to Fox, but some stayed with NBC (which later bought the New World stations that did not go to Fox). Among the stations due to switch were WJBK, Detroit's longtime CBS affiliate, and Cleveland's longtime CBS affiliate WJW-TV (both WJBK and WJW-TV were later purchased by Fox outright, although WJW-TV was sold by Fox in 2008). To avoid being consigned to UHF in what was then the ninth-largest market (Detroit) and 15th largest market (Cleveland-Akron), CBS heavily wooed Detroit's longtime ABC affiliate, WXYZ-TV, and WEWS, Cleveland's longtime ABC affiliate.

The E. W. Scripps Company, owner of WXYZ and WEWS, then told ABC that unless it agreed to affiliate with their stations in Phoenix, Tampa, and Baltimore, it would switch WXYZ to CBS. Scripps also threatened to switch WEWS to CBS. As a contingency, ABC approached SJL about buying WTVG and WJRT-TV in Flint, Michigan. As mentioned above, WTVG provides grade B coverage of Detroit itself and Detroit’s northern suburbs and city-grade coverage to Detroit's western and Downriver suburbs, as well as Grade B coverage to the Sandusky and Norwalk areas in Ohio. The deal, valued at $120 million, closed on August 29, 1995.

However, WTVG's affiliation contract didn't run out until October, so ABC had to run WTVG as an NBC affiliate for two months while NBC looked for a new affiliate in the area. On October 28, 1995, ABC moved to WTVG, sending the NBC affiliation to WNWO-TV. As it turned out, ABC agreed to the affiliation deal with Scripps as well, and WXYZ and WEWS retained their ABC affiliations. ABC chose not to trade its newly acquired stations for former O&O WXYZ-TV because of ABC's ownership of WJR-AM and two other FM stations in Detroit. Soon after ABC acquired WTVG, the station debuted their "Circle 13" logo that is still used to this day; it is nearly identical to that of then-sister station KTRK-TV in Houston. The last NBC program to air on WTVG was Friday Night Videos at 1:30 a.m., while the first ABC program to air on the station was The New Adventures of Madeline at 8:00 a.m. on October 28, 1995.

In 1996, Capital Cities/ABC was acquired by Disney. WTVG was the smallest station in the country that was an O&O of any major network, not counting semi-satellites (this includes WOGX in Ocala/Gainesville, Florida; which is a semi-satellite of WOFL in Orlando).

Because of its status as an O&O, WTVG aired the Veterans Day airing of the film Saving Private Ryan in 2004, while many affiliates preempted it out of fears of being fined by the FCC for indecency in the wake of the Super Bowl XXXVIII halftime show controversy. In fact, Scripps and Sinclair Broadcast Group (who combined owned four ABC affiliates in Ohio, as well as WCHS-TV in Charleston, West Virginia, which serves parts of Southern Ohio, and WXYZ) decided to preempt the film on all of their ABC affiliates. Among the then-seven ABC affiliates in or serving Ohio at the time (Lima and Wheeling, West Virginia, would later gain their own affiliates), this left WTVG and WYTV in Youngstown as the only ABC stations in Ohio to air the film. It was later determined that the movie showing was not a violation of FCC regulations.

ABC News Now was launched in 2004 on digital subchannels of ABC owned-and-operated stations and affiliates. For conversion to digital broadcasting, the station requested to stay on and was assigned Channel 13 by August 2007 and was temporarily assigned Channel 19 for temporary digital broadcast during the transition. ABC Owned Television Stations, including WTVG, launched on April 27, 2009, the Live Well Network in high definition on the station's sub-channels alongside the AccuWeather Channel. WTVG's broadcasts became digital-only, effective June 12, 2009. Digital channel 13 transmits at a lower power than it did on digital channel 19, so in some locations, there has been a reduction in coverage. Many VHF stations are applying to the FCC for power increases to restore their coverage area after moving from UHF back to VHF.

SJL Broadcasting ownership
On November 3, 2010, Broadcasting & Cable magazine announced that SJL Broadcasting, now owned by the principal owners of Lilly Broadcasting, made an agreement with Disney to buy back WTVG and WJRT, amid speculation that Disney may sell off ABC. Both stations retained their affiliations with ABC. SJL teamed up with a new private equity partner, Bain Capital, whose affiliated offshoot Sankaty Advisors provided the capital for the purchases (which amounted to $16.8 million on WTVG's end of the $30 million deal). WTVG began being owned by SJL Broadcasting again beginning April 1, 2011. On April 12, 2011, the new management dismissed around 20 people from a pre-sale work force of approximately 100—all behind-the-scenes staff—from the station, despite promising earlier that they would make no staff cuts. Similar cuts occurred at WJRT, though cuts there also involved that station's veteran newscasters Bill Harris and Joel Feick.

On January 13, 2011, WTVG filed an application to the FCC to increase its power from 14.6 kW to 16.7 kW. The station granted a construction permit on the power increase on March 7.

Sale to Gray Television
On July 24, 2014, SJL announced that it would sell WTVG and WJRT again, this time to Gray Television, owner of Lansing, Michigan's NBC affiliate WILX-TV, for $128 million—a value higher than that of their original sale to ABC. Gray also announced its intent to add The CW to WTVG's digital subchannels. The sale was completed on September 15.

On September 1, 2014, WTVG added The CW to its second digital subchannel to replace Live Well Network, acquiring the affiliation and syndicated programming from the previous Toledo 5 cable channel operated by Buckeye Cablesystem, and inheriting its previous cable positions. The move made The CW's programming available over-the-air and in high definition in the Toledo market for the first time since the network's launch.

On June 25, 2018, Gray announced its intent to acquire Raycom Media in order to merge their respective broadcasting assets (consisting of Raycom's 63 existing owned-and/or-operated television stations, and Gray's 93 television stations) under Gray's corporate umbrella, in a cash-and-stock merger transaction valued at $3.6 billion. As such, Gray was able to sell either WTVG or both WTOL and WUPW (separately as it would break the grandfathered LMA), since WTOL and WTVG rank among the four highest-rated stations in the Toledo market in total day viewership. It was later decided that Gray would sell WTOL and the SSA for WUPW, and keep WTVG. On August 20, 2018, Gray announced that they would retain WTVG and sell WTOL and the SSA for WUPW to rival broadcaster Tegna Inc., along with sister station in Odessa, Texas, KWES-TV for $105 million. The deal was completed on January 2, 2019.

On July 14, 2021, Gray announced it would sell WJRT-TV to Allen Media Group as part of its larger acquisition of the broadcasting assets of Meredith Corporation. As Gray elected to keep rival station WNEM-TV in the Flint market, the sale separated WJRT-TV from WTVG after 30 years as sister stations.

Programming

Syndicated programming
As of fall 2022, WTVG's syndicated programming includes The Drew Barrymore Show, Rachael Ray, The Kelly Clarkson Show, Entertainment Tonight, and Inside Edition. The latter two serve as a lead in to ABC's prime time schedule.

Ohio Lottery
On July 1, 2011, WTVG began to broadcast the nightly Ohio Lottery drawings, and broadcast the game show Cash Explosion on Saturday evenings. WTVG took over broadcasting the lottery drawings and game show from rival station WTOL.

News operation
WTVG presently broadcasts 40½ hours of locally produced newscasts each week (with 6½ hours each weekday and four hours each on Saturdays and Sundays). The station also produces a local discussion program, Bridges, which airs Sundays from 11:30 a.m. to noon in high definition.

WTVG ended the show Coffee with the Fords on June 19, 2011. The show was hosted by former Toledo mayor Jack Ford and his wife Cynthia. Coffee with the Fords was shown between 12:30–1 p.m. on Sunday afternoons and was on the air for over four years.

WTVG also airs two special Friday night sports programs, Football Friday showcasing games across northwest Ohio, during the high school football season and Basketball Friday showcasing girls' and boys' games across northwest Ohio during the high school basketball season.

WTVG utilizes the Sony PDW510 XDCAM camcorder. All Toledo stations (WTVG, WTOL/WUPW, and WNWO) use the Jeep Liberty as an ENG vehicle, due to the fact that they were made locally by Chrysler. WTVG also uses other Jeep-brand vehicles.

WTVG operated a 350,000-watt Doppler weather Radar named "Live Doppler 13000 HD". It was discontinued in 2018.

In 2011, WTVG received six Emmy Awards from the Lower Great Lakes chapter of the National Academy of Television Arts and Sciences. WTVG also received over 15 nominations for their news, a record for the station.

In June 2011, news anchors at WTVG began using iPads to read news stories instead of paper. WTVG is the first television station in Toledo to use the technology. WTOL began using iPads in late September 2011.

On April 4, 2012, WTVG announced that longtime chief meteorologist Stan Stachak would retire from the station at the end of May 2012. Stan Stachak has been at WTVG for over 30 years and became the chief meteorologist for the station back in 1980. Chief meteorologist Stan Stachak has overseen many technological advances during his 30-plus year tenure including the addition of Toledo's only Doppler weather radar in 2003. Stan Stachak stepped down as being the chief on April 20, 2012. Stachak's final broadcast was during the 11:00 p.m. newscast on May 27, 2012.

On September 13, 2021, WTVG premiered a 4 p.m. newscast.

High definition newscasts
On April 13, 2010, WTVG became the last ABC-owned station (as well as the first station in the Toledo market) to have upgraded its news productions to 16:9 widescreen enhanced definition. On July 2, 2010, WTVG became the first news station in Toledo and the ninth ABC-owned station to broadcast its newscasts in high definition. The in-studio cameras are in 720p HD, and field coverage is in widescreen enhanced definition. WTVG began using new HD graphics on January 17, 2012, and began broadcasting high definition commercials in May 2012. WTOL channel 11 began broadcasting their newscasts in high definition on April 21, 2011. WNWO began broadcasting newscasts in 16:9 enhanced definition widescreen on August 15, 2011. WUPW began broadcasting their newscasts in HD on May 31, 2012.

Notable former on-air staff
 Ryan Burr (now at Golf Channel)
 Rob Powers (later sports director at WABC-TV in New York City, now at WEWS-TV)

Subchannels
The station's digital signal is multiplexed:

See also
Circle 7 logo - WTVG's Circle 13 logo is a derivative of the Circle 7 logo

References

External links

ABC network affiliates
The CW affiliates
MeTV affiliates
Circle (TV network) affiliates
Ion Television affiliates
WeatherNation TV affiliates
Gray Television
TVG
Television channels and stations established in 1948
1948 establishments in Ohio
Former subsidiaries of The Walt Disney Company